Bega Ram Chauhan is an Indian politician.  He was elected to the Lok Sabha, the lower house of the Parliament of India from Ganganagar, Rajasthan as a member of the Janata Dal.

References

External links
Official biographical sketch in Parliament of India website

India MPs 1977–1979
India MPs 1989–1991
Lok Sabha members from Rajasthan
Janata Dal politicians
1937 births
Living people
Janata Party politicians
Swatantra Party politicians